The 1912–13 Georgetown Hoyas men's basketball team represented Georgetown University during the 1912–13 NCAA college basketball season. James Colliflower coached the team in his second season as head coach. Georgetown was an independent and played its home games at the Arcade Rink, also known as the Arcadia and as the Arcade Auditorium, in Washington, D.C., and finished the season with a record of 11-5.

Season recap

Junior forward and team captain Ronayne "Roy" Waldron led the team in scoring. He played in 15 games and started each of the 15, scored a career-high 163 points, averaging a career-high 10.9 points per game.

Roster
Sources

Georgetown players did not wear numbers on their jerseys this season. The first numbered jerseys in Georgetown mens basketball history would not appear until the 1933-34 season.

Senior forward John Martin later served in the U.S. armed forces during World War I, and while in military service died of influenza — the so-called "Spanish flu" — during the 1918–1919 influenza pandemic.

1912–13 schedule and results
Sources

It was common practice at this time for colleges and universities to include non-collegiate opponents in their schedules, with the games recognized as part of their official record for the season, and the February 12, 1913, game against the Maryland Athletic Club counted as part of Georgetowns won-loss record for 1912-13. It was not until 1952, after the completion of the 1951-52 season, that the National Collegiate Athletic Association (NCAA) ruled that colleges and universities could no longer count games played against non-collegiate opponents in their annual won-loss records.

Trinity College of North Carolina was the future Duke University.

|-
!colspan=9 style="background:#002147; color:#8D817B;"| Regular Season

References

Georgetown Hoyas men's basketball seasons
Georgetown
Georgetown Hoyas men's basketball team
Georgetown Hoyas men's basketball team